Michele Morrone (born 3 October 1990) is an Italian actor, model, singer, and fashion designer appearing in both Italian and Polish films. He gained international recognition after portraying the role of Massimo Torricelli in the 2020 erotic romantic drama 365 Days.

Early life
Morrone was born on 3 October 1990 in Reggio Calabria, Italy. He is the youngest of four children, and he has three older sisters. His father worked as a construction worker and died in 2003 when Morrone was 12 years old. His mother, Angela, a seamstress, and his father, Natale were both from Bitonto, but moved to Melegnano when their children were young in order to find better employment opportunities.

Morrone decided to become an actor after watching a Harry Potter film at age 11. He began acting in an after school program at his middle school. Morrone repeated his first year of High School after being held back for bad behavior. He then studied professional acting in a theater in the city of Pavia, at the Teatro Fraschini di Pavia.

Career

Acting

Morrone's acting career began in 2011 by playing the role of Riccardo in Second Chance, a three-episode web series directed by Piergiorgio Seidita, which was cancelled after one season. He also appeared in a music video by the Italian girl band, Makay, in 2012. After gaining more experience in the field, he started playing lead roles in short films. He acted in Il Tempo di una Sigaretta and E la Vita Continua. He was featured in a drama show titled Che Dio ci Aiuti. His projects include Italian TV series including Come un Delfino (2011), Provaci Ancora (2015), Squadra Antimafia (2015), Sirene (2016), Renata Fonte (2017), Il Processo (The Trial) (2018), and Medici (2018). In 2016, he took part in the eleventh season of the Italian version of Dancing with the Stars (Ballando con le Stelle), where he placed second. In 2019, Morrone played the lead role of Luigi in Bar Giuseppe.

In 2020, Morrone became internationally known after performing the lead role of Massimo Torricelli, a mafia crime boss, in 365 Days. The film was released theatrically in Poland on 7 February 2020 and was subsequently made available on Netflix on 7 June 2020. He signed a three-year contract with the production company and filmed two more films to complete the trilogy.

Music
Morrone is a professional guitarist and singer. He learned to play guitar at the age of 25 by watching YouTube videos. He released an album titled Dark Room which has several songs featured in the official 365 Days soundtrack including one of his most famous songs, "Feel It", that has scenes with actress Anna Maria Sieklucka (Laura Biel), from the film, in its music video. The album was released on 14 February 2020 and was produced by label company AGORA S.A.

Morrone joined YouTube on 16 January 2020. He has gained over one million subscribers and 104 million overall views on his channel (as of 8 August 2020). The most viewed video on his channel is the music video of "", which has gained 51 million views.

Other ventures
On 2 August 2020, Morrone launched a women's beachwear clothing brand, AurumRoma. He confirmed the creation of the company via an Instagram live story on 8 August 2020. Shortly after the announcement, the website of the clothing brand crashed due to heavy traffic. Morrone makes his own designs in collaboration with fashion designer Chiara Pollano. The company is owned by Morrone, and run by Spazio Arcó company.

Personal life
Morrone married Rouba Saadeh, a Lebanese stylist, in 2014. The couple had a civil marriage in Italy and Lebanon. They separated in 2018 but remain legally married.  They had two sons together, one born in 2014, and the other born in 2017.

Discography

Studio albums

Singles

Promotional singles

Filmography

Film

Television

Music videos

Awards and nominations

Notes

References

External links
 
 

21st-century Italian male actors
21st-century Italian male singers
1990 births
Italian male film actors
Italian male television actors
Living people
People from Bitonto
People from Melegnano